Birdwell can refer to:

 Birdwell, South Yorkshire, a village in South Yorkshire, England
 Birdwell (clothing), an American clothing company 
 Brian Birdwell, former U.S. serviceman and member of the Texas Senate
 Dwight W. Birdwell, former U.S. serviceman, awarded Medal of Honor

See also
 includes several other holders of the surname